Mongol Shuudan is a rock band formed in Moscow in 1988.

"Монгол Шуудан" means "Mongol Post" in the Mongolian language. This unusual choice is explained by the band vocalist Valeri Skoroded very simply: the band was standing at a bus stop by a  booth and their eyes were caught by fancy postage stamps with the exotic words on them.

The group's music is mostly anti-governmental, pro-anarchist in its message, with the group identifying themselves with the Black Guards of the Russian Civil War.

Many of their songs are modernized versions of anarchist civil war songs. Some of their songs include "Commissar," "Chekist," "Freedom or Death," "Sabbath on the Bald Mountain", and so forth. Since the collapse of the Soviet Union, the group has continued to produce music, much of which is available  on their website. 

The band has performed over 100 shows and toured Europe, Israel, and all of the Russian Federation.

Members 

Valeriy Skoroded – vocal, guitar, all texts
Eugeniy Put'makov aka Nicholas Crowen – bass
Sergey Kryuchkov – lead guitar
Aleksey Portnov – drums
Gleb Gorshkov – sound engineering

Among former members are:

Denis Serikov — guitar in 1996—1998

Discography 

1989 "Паровоз анархия", 
1991 "Гуляй поле", 
1991 "Бандитский альбом", 
1992 "Черемуха", 
1993 "Собачья чушь ", 
1994 "Гомерический хохот", 
1995 "Чересчур", 
1996 "Истина", 
1997 "ALIVE",
1999 "Абрикосы", 
2001 "Дюжинолетие", 
2001 "Скатертью дорога", 
2002 "Choisis de..", 
2002 "Свобода или смерть", 
2003 "Жертва",
2004 "Заплати и свободен"
2004 "Сплошь и рядом"
2006 "Вечная мерзлота"
2006 "Собственность—это кража"
2011 "Естественный отбор"
2018 "Инстинкт агрессивности".

External links
Mongol Shuudan website 

Russian punk rock groups
Anarcho-punk groups
Musical groups from Moscow
Soviet punk rock groups